Youna Kang (born 27 February 1990), better known by her online 3D Virtual YouTuber persona CodeMiko and alias The Technician, is a South Korean-American Twitch streamer and YouTuber. Kang is best known for her live streams on Twitch, interviewing other streamers, content creators and internet personalities as her alter ego persona CodeMiko and for pushing the envelope with regards to interactivity in VTuber technology.

Kang created the CodeMiko persona using Unreal Engine, a motion capture suit from Xsens, motion capture gloves from Manus VR and a facial tracking helmet from MOCAP Design. The CodeMiko avatar is composed of 36000 polygons, modelled in Autodesk Maya and textured using Adobe Substance.
While Kang originally created CodeMiko alone, the project is now developed by a team consisting of an engineer, an artist / animator / rigger, a publicist, a personal assistant and a manager.

Kang now focuses on leading the development effort, on broadcasting and idea generation. Kang is focused not just on the broadcasting, but rather on introducing new standards of interactivity with her audience. CodeMiko's virtual environment is designed to be quasi interactive, meaning that viewers can influence and modify the CodeMiko avatar and surroundings by engaging in live stream chat or by donating money.

Career
Kang came up with the idea of CodeMiko while working at Nickelodeon. After being laid off due to the COVID-19 pandemic, she decided to pursue streaming full time. Early on, she made around $300 per month from Twitch, which could not cover rent. This move was quite risky considering that Kang went into debt to acquire the Xsens Mo-cap suit, in total she accumulated over $20,000 of debt in order to get the setup she needed. She has attributed this debt and her poor risk management to her success: 

Kang states that, since CodeMiko project has been a success, she can now afford a comfortable living.

Streaming
Kang had her streaming breakthrough in 2021. She has attributed her sudden raise in popularity due to having a viral tweet on Twitter and going viral on r/LiveStreamFails on Reddit.

CodeMiko
The CodeMiko avatar's in-universe backstory, is that she is a video game character without a game. She had always wanted to be in a mainstream video game, but never succeeded in doing so, due to her 'Glitch' (a story arc very similar to Vanellope von Schweetz from the Wreck-It Ralph franchise). CodeMiko has expressed that she was forced to take smaller roles, such as a bush in The Last of Us, following the archetypical story of the struggling Hollywood actress, someone who just wants to be in a movie, any movie, but for Miko, any video game.
She finally managed to find her way into Kang / The Technicians Unreal Engine project, and thus becoming a twitch streamer. She is currently roaming different game worlds, looking for a place she will fit in. So far she has visited the world of dead memes and The Sims.

The CodeMiko avatar is aware of the Technician and frequently breaks the Fourth Wall, both indirectly through cross-over interviews such as CodeMiko interviewing the Technician, and directly through the use of augmented reality.

The 'glitchyness' of the CodeMiko character is expressed and explored through her sometimes glitchying into her evil alter ego avatar simply known as 'Glitch', exchanging her usual pink-haired avatar, for a semi-transparent Matrix digital rain-inspired avatar. The 'Glitch' avatar is additionally distinguished by having a deeper and hoarser voice achieved through the use of a voice changer. Glitch is very profane and seeks to offend. 
CodeMiko was originally released and developed under the name 'mikoglitch', but the named was dropped as it conflicted with 'Miko Kubota' of Glitch Techs.

The interview show has been compared to 1990s animated parody talk show Space Ghost Coast to Coast.
On CodeMiko, Kang said, "She's kind of stupid, unfiltered, and not afraid to say whatever is on her mind or what she sees."

PogChamps
CodeMiko participated in the online amateur chess tournament PogChamps 3 in 2021. She placed last with 4 losses and 0 wins, along with streamer Myth.
She was coached by PogChamps coaches WGM Anna Rudolf and Andrea Botez.

TOS PTSD
Kang has described having developed "TOS PTSD" following her unintentionally breaking Twitch's terms of service (TOS) and subsequent receiving bans, leading to her developing economic anxiety and seeking help by psychiatrist and Twitch streamer Alok Kanojia on stream.

Kang has expressed worries about Twitch's introduction of a "Brand Safety Score" system, with regards to how her X-rated jokes and humor may not be advertiser-friendly content, and thus may threaten her income potential on the platform. She has since described how her worries lessened as she came to be sponsored by the energy drink brand G-Fuel, the gaming-chair company Mavix, Seagate Gaming and metal poster company Displate.

Reception
The CodeMiko project has generally been positively received, with Kotaku describing CodeMiko as "The Future Of Streaming" and Designboom stating that she is "Revolutionizing the digital space". The Financial Times have reported that her content might be signalling "The next frontier of digital entertainment", while Quartz has reported CodeMiko as "The talk show host of the future". The Verge has reported CodeMiko as someone who is "reshaping the Twitch landscape in her image".

The project has also received interest from several hentai producers.

Awards and nominations

See also
 Ami Yamato — Japanese virtual YouTube vlogger
 Kizuna AI — one of the largest and earliest VTubers
 Projekt Melody — fellow VTuber, who also has a glitchy alter ego - Melware.

Notes

References

External links 
 

21st-century South Korean women
American YouTubers
American people of Korean descent
Gaming YouTubers
VTubers
Let's Players
Twitch (service) streamers
Video game commentators
Women video bloggers
YouTube vloggers
Rancho Bernardo High School alumni
Palomar College alumni
Ringling College of Art and Design alumni
1990 births
Living people
Streamer Award winners